Elite 1 is the top level rugby league competition in France, sanctioned by the French Rugby League Federation. The season runs from September to April, which is in contrast to the majority of other major domestic rugby league competitions worldwide. The clubs play each other home and away then they enter into a play-off series culminating with a Grand Final. The competition is the continuation and first division of the French Rugby League Championship, which has been in existence since 1934, and is generally regarded as the third most important domestic championship in the world, behind Australia's National Rugby League and the transnational European Super League, and ahead of the NZRL National Competition, Balkan Super League, Rhino Cup and USA Rugby League.

History

The French Rugby League Championship began in 1934, the first one being the only one where it was won by the team finishing top of the table on points and not by a play-off series. 

The Elite One Championship was founded in 2002 after the French Rugby League Championship was split into two divisions. The format stayed the same with teams playing each other home and away, before a play-off series would determine the Champions. The club finishing bottom would not be automatically relegated, it would be dependent on whether the club finishing top of Elite Two Championship either wanted to be promoted or their facilities were up to standard.

Teams for 2022–23 season

Results
 

Source:

Winners

Media Coverage

Television 
Unlike, for instance, the BBC, France Television didn't offer any program to the French public about Rugby League. 

Sport en France cover the Championship across their television platforms nationwide. Coverage includes the match of the week and one match from each week of the playoffs including the Grand Final.

From 2020, some Elite 1 games are televised by a local channel ViàOccitanie; this is a free-to-air channel in the South of France but they are also available on the internet and via the triple play internet devices. Therefore, they offer, indirectly, free nationwide coverage of the domestic championship.

Presently, French clubs have to fund the broadcast of their own games or to  televise their own matches themselves via the social networks or YouTube.

Radio 
Radio Marseillette, a local Southern radio,  has rugby league debate and news every Saturday from 10:00 to 12:00. They also have commentary on some Elite League games.

Press 
The French national mainstream media barely follow the game. Very occasionally, some articles about the sport are published in newspapers such as Le Monde, Le Figaro or the national Sport newspaper L'Équipe.

Nevertheless, there is undoubtedly a French specificity: the Weekly Rugby Union magazine Midi Olympique has a one-page section devoted to Rugby League. However,  only two local newspapers genuinely cover the game; L'Indépendant ( based in the South of France) and la Dépêche du Midi (based in the South west of the country).

The British Rugby League press cover this championship; for example magazines like Rugby Leaguer & League Express offer a weekly report of the games. In Australia, the monthly publication Rugby League Review offer a few columns about  the games as well.

See also 

 Rugby league in France
 France national rugby league team
 France women's national rugby league team
 French Rugby League Championship
 Elite 2 (rugby league)
 National Division 1
 National Division 2
 Lord Derby Cup
 Coupe Falcou
 Paul Dejean Cup
 French rugby league system

Notes

References

External links
 Google map showing location of Elite 1 sides
 French rugby league federation
 Infostreize
 Le monde du rugby à XIII

Rugby league competitions in France
Sports leagues established in 2002
Professional sports leagues in France